State Highway 50 (SH 50) is a State Highway in Kerala, India that starts in Chavakkad and ends in Wadakkancherry. The highway is 31.515 km long.

Route 
Chavakkad-Mammiyoor-Kottapadi-Kunnamkulam-Marathamcode-Pannithadam-Vellarakad-Erumapetty-Wadakanchery

See also 
Roads in Kerala
List of State Highways in Kerala

References 

State Highways in Kerala
Roads in Thrissur district